The 1922–23 Rugby Football League season was the 28th season of rugby league football.

Season summary

Pre-season the Northern Rugby Football Union decided to drop the 'Union' in favour of 'League' and the first annual conference of the League is held at Keswick.

Hull Kingston Rovers moved from their Craven Street ground to Craven Park at the eastern end of Holderness Road this season.  Their first game against Wakefield Trinity on 2 September ended in a 3-0 defeat.

Wigan Highfield joined the League.

Hull Kingston Rovers won their first ever Championship when they defeated Huddersfield 15-5 in the play-off final.

Hull F.C. had finished the regular season as the league leaders and were the first in that position not to contend a play-off final.

The Challenge Cup was won by Leeds when they defeated Hull F.C. 28-3 in the final.

Wigan won the Lancashire League, and Hull F.C. won the Yorkshire League. Wigan beat Leigh 20–2 to win the Lancashire Cup, and York beat Batley 5–0 to win the Yorkshire County Cup.

Championship

Championship play-off

Challenge Cup

Leeds defeat Hull F.C. 28-3 in the final at Belle Vue, Wakefield to win their second Challenge Cup in their second appearance.

Leeds: 28

Leeds Tries: Syd Walmsley, Harold Buck, Billy Bowen, Joe Brittain, Davies, Ashton

Leeds Goals: Joe Thompson 5

Hull FC: 3

Hull FC Tries: Jimmy Kennedy

Half-time: 10-0

Attendance: 29,335 (at Belle Vue, Wakefield)

References

Sources
1922-23 Rugby Football League season at wigan.rlfans.com
The Challenge Cup at The Rugby Football League website

1922 in English rugby league
1923 in English rugby league
Northern Rugby Football League seasons